Everette Pedescleaux (born January 19, 1985) is a former American football defensive end. He was signed by the Denver Broncos as an undrafted free agent in 2009. He played college football at Northern Iowa.

College career
A native of Plymouth, Minnesota, Pedescleaux originally signed a football scholarship with the University of Minnesota with the intention to play basketball. However, he left the program before playing a game for the Gophers.

He attended the University of Northern Iowa, where he has played football in the defensive line for the Panthers. He started only 20 of 51 games for the Panthers. He started only eight of 15 in 2008. Pedescleaux had 54 tackles, 11.5 tackle-for-loss and 6.5 quarterback sacks and blocked six kick for the Panthers in 2008 and was named All-Missouri Valley Football Conference First-team.

Professional career
Pedescleaux projected as a 3-4 defensive end in the NFL and was considered a "sleeper" for the 2009 NFL Draft, but went undrafted. He was signed by the Denver Broncos and was placed on the practice squad/injured list on November 3, 2009.  His practice squad contract with Denver expired in January 2010.

References

External links
Northern Iowa Panthers bio

1985 births
Living people
People from Plymouth, Minnesota
American football defensive linemen
Northern Iowa Panthers football players
Denver Broncos players
Cleveland Gladiators players